The 1972–73 1. Slovenská národná hokejová liga season was the 4th season of the 1. Slovenská národná hokejová liga, the second level of ice hockey in Czechoslovakia alongside the 1. Česká národní hokejová liga. 12 teams participated in the league, and TJ Lokomotíva Bučina Zvolen won the championship. TJ ZPA Prešov and VTJ Dukla Trnava relegated.

Regular season

Standings

Group 1–6

Group 7–12

Qualification to 1973–74 Czechoslovak Extraliga

References

External links
 Season on avlh.sweb.cz (PDF)
 Season on hokejpoprad.sk

Czech
1st. Slovak National Hockey League seasons
2